Bennett Auxford "B. A." Burks, Jr. (January 24, 1883 – February 24, 1938) was a college football player and physician.

University of Alabama
Burks was a prominent running back for the Alabama Crimson White of the University of Alabama from 1902 to 1906. He was said to be the school's "first running back hero" who would "carry whole teams on his back." He was nominated though not selected for an Associated Press All-Time Southeast 1869-1919 era team.  At Alabama he was a member of the Alpha Tau Omega fraternity.

1905
Burks was captain of the 1905 team, selected All-Southern the same year. Burks starred in the opening win of 17 to 0 over Maryville. A number of Alabama turnovers kept the game scoreless through halftime. T. S. Sims scored the first touchdown and Burks added a 95-yard return for a touchdown. "The overworked Burks, who appeared to bear the entire brunt of Alabama's offense," collapsed on the field during the second half of a 12 to 5 loss to Georgia Tech. Burks scored in the 30 to 0 victory over Auburn in what was then the largest crowd ever to see a game in Birmingham (4,000).

1906
In the Iron Bowl of 1906 he scored all of Alabama's points in a 10 to 0 victory.

High school football
In 1908 he coached the Barton Academy high school football team.

Physician
Burks was the college physician of Rollins College for 12 years. When Rollins opened a 7-bed infirmary in 1933, he and one Dr. Ruth Hart cared for students, assisted by a staff of nurses.

He died of a throat malady on February 24, 1938.

References

External links

1883 births
1938 deaths
All-Southern college football players
American football running backs
Alabama Crimson Tide football players
Sportspeople from Tuscaloosa, Alabama
Players of American football from Alabama
Physicians from Alabama
People from Winter Park, Florida